Mathias Juan Jesus Caserio, born in Rosario in Argentina on December 18, 1986, is an Argentine footballer who currently plays in Chilean club Cobreloa of Calama.

Caserio began his playing career with Central Córdoba in 2006 where he won a number of championships with the team.

Since 2009 Caserio has been playing in Chile with Cobreloa.

External links
BDFA profile

1986 births
Living people
Footballers from Rosario, Santa Fe
Argentine footballers
Association football midfielders
Central Córdoba de Rosario footballers
Cobreloa footballers
Expatriate footballers in Chile